Temitope Balogun Joshua (12 June 1963 – 5 June 2021), popularly known as T. B. Joshua, was a Nigerian charismatic pastor, televangelist, and philanthropist. He was the leader and founder of Synagogue, Church of All Nations (SCOAN), a Christian megachurch that runs the Emmanuel TV television station from Lagos.

Joshua was widely known across Africa and Latin America and had a large social media presence with over 6,000,000 fans on Facebook. His YouTube channel, Emmanuel TV, had over 1,000,000 subscribers and was the most-viewed Christian ministry on the platform before the channel was suspended by YouTube in 2021 for alleged homophobic hate speech. Joshua was described by media outlets as the "Oprah of Evangelism" and "YouTube's most popular pastor".

Joshua was awarded various accolades, notably receiving the Officer of the Order of the Federal Republic (OFR) by the Nigerian government in 2008 and being voted the Yoruba man of the decade by Pan-Yoruba media outlet Irohin-Odua. He was called one of Africa's 50 most influential people by Pan-African magazines The Africa Report and New African Magazine.

, according to Forbes, Joshua was Nigeria's third-richest pastor, although the claim was immediately denied in a statement by the church. He was a controversial figure, and was officially blacklisted by the government of Cameroon in 2010.

Biography
Joshua was born on June 12 of 1963 in Ondo State. According to Joshua, he spent 15 months in his mother's womb and narrowly avoided death after a quarry explosion near his house sent rocks through its roof just seven days after his birth. According to his followers, a prophecy about the birth of a man of God from the poor neighborhoods of Oosin in Arigidi Akoko given 100 years earlier applied to T. B. Joshua.

Joshua, then known as Balogun Francis, attended St. Stephen's Anglican Primary School in Arigidi Akoko, Nigeria, between 1971 and 1977, but failed to complete one year of secondary school education. In school, he was known as "small pastor" because of his love for the Bible. He worked in various casual jobs after his schooling had ended, including carrying chicken waste at a poultry farm. He organised Bible studies for local children and attended evening school during this period. Joshua attempted to join the Nigerian military but was thwarted due to a train breakdown that left him stranded en route to the military academy. He died on 5 June 2021 at his home in Lagos shortly after his Saturday night teaching of undisclosed cause.

Synagogue, Church of All Nations (SCOAN) 
Joshua wrote that in a heavenly vision he had received divine anointing and a covenant from God to start his ministry. Following this, Joshua founded the ministry organisation known as Synagogue, Church of All Nations (SCOAN). According to the organisation, more than 15,000 members attend its weekly Sunday service; visitors from outside Nigeria are accommodated in the accommodation blocks constructed at the church.

The Guardian reported that SCOAN attracts more weekly attendees than the combined number of visitors to Buckingham Palace and the Tower of London. SCOAN's popular services have also resulted in an enormous boost for local businesses and hoteliers.

Despite Joshua's popularity, the church has only one branch, located in Ghana. According to Joshua, "it is not yet time" for him to have branches worldwide as "it will be too much for my character".

Religious tourism and Potential relocation to Israel 
SCOAN has been described as “Nigeria’s biggest tourist attraction” and “the most visited destination by religious tourists in West Africa,” with thousands of foreigners flocking to attend the church's weekly services. Figures released by the Nigerian Immigration Service indicated that six out of every ten foreign travellers coming into Nigeria are bound for SCOAN, a fact discussed in Zimbabwean parliament when addressing the economic potentials of religious tourism.

This Day newspaper reported that “about two million local and inbound tourists” visit SCOAN annually. The church's popularity has led to an increase in flight routes to Lagos from several African countries in 2013. Joshua's contribution to Nigeria's religious tourism was highlighted when the cleric hinted at the possibility of relocating his ministry to Israel during a Sunday service. Several prominent Nigerians opposed the relocation, urging Joshua to remain in the country, and citing the economic setbacks Nigeria would likely experience as a result of his potential relocation.

Purported healings (by anointing water) and miracles 
Many people have said they were healed by anointing water that had been prayed over by Joshua and given to those who were unable to physically attend his church in Lagos. Others say they were protected from deadly incidents because they were carrying the water with them.

In 2013, four people died in a stampede in Joshua's Ghanaian branch when an unadvertised service in which the water was being distributed drew huge crowds that exceeded the church's capacity. The incident nearly brought Ghana's capital city, Accra, to a standstill.

Joshua also made headlines when he claimed his anointing water could cure people suffering from Ebola. He subsequently sent 4,000 bottles of the water alongside a cash gift of $50,000 to the Ebola-stricken nation of Sierra Leone. This came after Lagos State Health officials visited Joshua and requested that he publicly discourage Ebola victims from visiting his church for prayers. A Sierra Leonean politician later announced that the water helped stop the spread of the disease and cured several Ebola victims.

SCOAN claims Joshua regularly facilitates miracles at the church. Several hundred people, both Nigerian and international, visit SCOAN each week to participate in prayer lines, in which visitors are prayed over by Joshua. SCOAN has published numerous videos claiming to document the healing of illnesses, disabilities, and injuries, many of which are known to be medically incurable, such as HIV/AIDS, blindness and open wounds.

Spiritual healing at SCOAN has been the subject of several media reports, including a mention in Time Magazine, an Associated Press interview and an article by Foreign Policy detailing the tendency of Nigerians to seek spiritual help due to insufficient medical facilities.

Wide public debate was stirred within Nigeria when the father of abducted school girl Ese Oruru stated his intention to take his daughter to T.B. Joshua for prayers following her release. Similarly, a leaked report stating the intention of Nigeria's embattled former petroleum minister Diezani Alison-Madueke to visit Joshua for spiritual support in her battle against breast cancer elicited controversy.

them.

Purported aleged exorcisms and celebrity deliverance 
SCOAN is also known for the purported deliverance during its services of people allegedly possessed by evil spirits. Strange occurrences have been reported during these deliverance prayers, including the case of a South African girl who allegedly cried blood and a Liberian man who began behaving like a dog. A young man allegedly delivered from a homosexual demon at SCOAN also attracted widespread media attention, as did the purported transformation of a Paraguayan transvestite from a being a woman to a being a man. After deliverance, those involved often confess the atrocities which the evil spirit allegedly pushed them to engage in, such as prostitution, armed robbery, internet fraud and human trafficking.

Ghanaian human rights lawyer Kwabla Senanu claimed that he was delivered from a spiritual problem. Similarly, Ghanaian musician Denise Williams said she was delivered from a demon that had pushed her to become a drug addict and to suicidal thoughts.

Veteran Nigerian Nollywood actress Camilla Mberekpe was also reportedly delivered at SCOAN. Popular Nollywood actor Jim Iyke also said he received deliverance at SCOAN, and a video of the event subsequently went viral.

A video of Kenyan Olympic athlete Mercy Cherono receiving deliverance through Joshua's prayers attracted widespread attention in Kenya. She subsequently testified in the company of her husband how the evil spirit had negatively affected her young marriage and career.

Foreign visits
Joshua travelled to Korea, Singapore, Indonesia, Australia, Colombia, Mexico, Peru and Paraguay to hold what he called "crusades." He also visited Israel to receive a humanitarian award from ZAKA and to visit biblical sites. Joshua's "Miracle Crusade" in Cali, Colombia in July 2014 was allegedly attended by 100,000 people and held in the Estadio Olímpico Pascual Guerrero. He travelled to the iconic Estadio Azteca in Mexico, and was allegedly visited by 200,000 people over two days in May 2015. Joshua's two-day visit to Estadio Monumental "U" in Lima, Peru, attracted nearly 100,000 in September 2016, making headlines in local Peruvian media. In August 2017, Joshua held a Crusade in Paraguay at Estadio Defensores del Chaco. His visit caused a media storm when the Paraguayan parliament approved that the cleric be awarded the National Order of Merit, the country's highest honour, which is usually reserved only for Paraguayan citizens. Testimonies from those who alleged they were healed through Joshua's prayers at the crusade made headlines in local media.

In June 2019, Joshua held a two-day event at the Amphitheatre of Mount Precipice in Nazareth, Israel, the historic hometown of Jesus Christ. The event was the subject of intense media scrutiny. Local religious officials told their followers to boycott the event and several small protests were held calling for the event's cancellation. However, an estimated 15,000 people travelled from over 50 nations to attend the event, significantly boosting local tourism.

Humanitarian work
A Forbes blogger estimated that Joshua spent $20 million on "education, healthcare and rehabilitation programs for former Niger Delta militants". There is also a rehabilitation programme for militants from Nigeria's volatile Niger Delta region, repentant armed robbers and sex workers who came to the church for 'deliverance'.

Joshua provided financial aid to several communities in distress, notably providing two electrical transformers to a local community after theirs was burned beyond repair. He donated over N26m to help restore electricity and put an end to over two years of power outage in four councils in the Akoko area of Ondo State. The cleric has additionally made several large donations to police forces in Nigeria, Ghana and Colombia.

SCOAN has a 'scholarship program' which caters for the academic needs of students in their thousands, ranging from primary to tertiary education. In 2012, Joshua sponsored a Nigerian student doing a PhD in Oxford University, with Nigerian media reporting she received £100,000 from the church. He also gave a scholarship to a young Motswana to study at Harvard Law School in America.

After the 2010 Haiti earthquake, Joshua sent a team of medical personnel and humanitarian workers to the affected area, establishing a field hospital called 'Clinique Emmanuel'.

He additionally sent support to nations such as Philippines, India and Ghana in the wake of varying natural disasters. The 'Emmanuel TV Team' also assisted victims of the earthquake that struck the nation of Ecuador in April 2016, providing over $500,000 worth of humanitarian aid.

Joshua funded the building and running of a school in Lahore, Pakistan named 'Emmanuel School'. He also rebuilt a school in a rural area destroyed by the 2016 Ecuador earthquake, travelling to Ecuador for the opening of the school in June 2017.

Several groups of Nigerians attempting illegal travel to Europe through Libya have been supported at SCOAN following their deportation from the North African nation with only the clothes on their backs. Stories of the harsh conditions they encountered and Joshua's subsequent assistance made headlines in several local newspapers.

In 2009, Joshua started a football club, My People FC, as part of efforts to help the youth. Two members of the team played for Nigeria's Golden Eaglets in the 2009 FIFA U-17 World Cup. Sani Emmanuel, who apparently lived in SCOAN for several years, was Nigeria's top-scorer and the tournament's MVP. Emmanuel and his colleague Ogenyi Onazi signed professional contracts with SS Lazio, Onazi a key player for the Nigerian Senior Team, the Super Eagles.

WBO International Light Middleweight boxing champion King Davidson Emenogu said that Joshua has financially supported him throughout his career and purportedly prophesied that he would be a world boxing champion.

Joshua was involved in the meeting of the family of the late president of Liberia, Samuel Doe, with the former warlord Prince Yormie Johnson who was responsible for Doe's death. During this meeting the family publicly forgave Johnson who said it was through Joshua's prayers that he stopped drinking alcohol and turned to Christianity.

The cleric also played a prominent role in reconciling broken homes and restoring families torn apart by false accusations.

Humanitarian awards 
In recognition of his humanitarian activities, he was awarded a National Honour by the Nigerian government in 2008 as well as receiving a letter of appreciation from the United Nations. He was further honoured as an Ambassador of Peace by the Arewa Youth Forum, a predominantly Muslim organisation, as well as being recognised with an 'award of excellence' by ZAKA, Israel's primary rescue and recovery voluntary service.

Claimed prophecies
SCOAN claims that Joshua has successfully predicted events in the lives of individuals who attend his church services as well as worldwide events, including a purported prophecy of Michael Jackson's death, and the outcome of two African Cup of Nations (AFCON) final matches, which were won by Zambia and Nigeria respectively. He has been voted by the public among the most famous prophets.

His prophecy about the impending death of an African president was widely reported in African press. Joshua's followers believe the prophecy concerned the former president of Malawi Bingu wa Mutharika who died in 2012, aged 78.

False rumors spread using Joshua's name are known to have caused widespread panic in communities, affected sporting events, music concerts and led people to stop using social networks.

When Hamza Al-Mustapha, the Chief Security Officer of former Nigerian President Sani Abacha, was released after eleven years of imprisonment, his first port of call was to Joshua's church in acknowledgement of a 'prophecy' the cleric allegedly gave him when Abacha was still in power.

Critics argue that Joshua's predictions are too vague.

Alleged MH370 prophecy 
SCOAN released a video claiming that TB Joshua predicted the Malaysia Airlines MH370 event. The prophecy received a lot of attention on social media and its accompanying YouTube video amassed over 1 million views.

Terrorist attacks 
Several terrorist attacks perpetrated by ISIS, Al-Qaeda affiliates and Al-Shabaab militants have allegedly been predicted by Joshua, including the November 2015 Paris attacks, the Garissa University College attack in Kenya, the Ouagadougou hotel siege in Burkina Faso and the 2016 Brussels Bombings. It is also claimed that he predicted the Boston bombing attacks in America.

Joshua's alleged prophecy in April 2016 that an impending terror attack would befall Ghana made national headlines in the West African nation and led the national police to issue a statement calling for the general public to be calm and vigilant. 600 foreigners reportedly cancelled their visits to Ghana in the wake of the statement. Days later, a captured Malian terrorist confessed that his group had planned to target Ghana.

US election prophecy
Joshua incorrectly predicted that Hillary Clinton would win the 2016 US election. After this prophecy failed to materialise, with Donald Trump winning the election, Joshua stated that he was referring to Clinton's win in the popular vote and any misinterpretation was due to a lack of "spiritual understanding".

2017 Zimbabwe coup
A video of Joshua predicting "the military" of an undisclosed Southern African nation embarrassing, killing or capturing "a President or Vice-President ... or the First Lady of that nation‚” surfaced on social media after the statement, which was made and recorded in August 2014, was interpreted as a prophecy of the 2017 Zimbabwean coup d'état against Robert Mugabe.

Coronavirus 
Joshua claimed that COVID-19 would disappear globally on 27 March 2020.

Influence in African politics
A BBC Africa journalist once suggested that Joshua was “the most powerful man in Africa” due to his alleged influence in the African political sphere.

Ghana
Days after the late John Atta Mills became President of Ghana in 2009, his first port of call was Joshua's church for a thanksgiving service where he revealed the cleric had accurately ‘prophesied’ his ascension to power and specific details relating to his narrow victory over Nana Akufo-Addo. Joshua was a regular visitor to Ghana during Mills' early presidency and allegedly organised prayer warriors to be praying in Osu Castle.

Malawi
Joshua's much-publicised prophecy concerning the death of Malawian President Bingu Mutharika garnered intense media attention and was subsequently the subject of a Malawian government inquiry as his successor, Joyce Banda, is a devotee of the cleric. Banda claimed Joshua's prayers healed her husband after he suffered a stroke and regularly visited Joshua in Nigeria while she was Head of State.

Tanzania
Joshua played the role of a peacemaker in the aftermath of the Tanzanian elections in 2015, visiting the country to meet and hold reconciliatory talks with President John Magufuli – a member of his church – and opposition leader Edward Lowassa. Commentators acknowledged his visit significantly reduced tensions in the country after the elections which the opposition party alleged were fraught with irregularities.

Liberia
Joshua was a key influence in former Liberian warlord Senator Prince Yormie Johnson’s decision to endorse the candidacy of George Weah for president in the 2017 Liberian elections. His endorsement came days after the two were spotted publicly together in SCOAN, a visit that caused a media storm in Liberia. Weah's main opponent and former Vice President, Joseph Boakai, also allegedly requested to visit Joshua in light of the elections. Weah eventually won the election to become Liberia's 25th President.

South Sudan
In November 2019, Joshua visited South Sudan where he was received by President Salva Kiir Mayardit. He led Mayardit and his cabinet in prayers for peace at the nation’s Presidential Palace in Juba and called on leaders to overcome their differences in a message broadcast on South Sudan’s state television. In February 2020, South Sudan finally formed a unity government with peace brokered between Mayardit and rival leader Riek Machar.

Emmanuel TV
Emmanuel TV, the SCOAN television station, was founded on 8 March 2006 by Joshua. Its Sunday services are broadcast live. Joshua's programmes also air weekly on a number of local television stations across Africa. It debuted on DStv and GOtv in November 2015, as well as StarTimes in February 2016. In its profile on Joshua, the BBC described him as "Nigeria's best known televangelist".

Emmanuel TV's motto is 'Changing lives, changing nations, changing the world.' The station is also known for its catch-phrase, ‘Distance Is Not A Barrier’, encouraging viewers to ‘pray along’ with T.B. Joshua by ‘touching the screen’. There are several claims of people receiving miraculous 'healing' through these prayers, including popular Nollywood actress Tonto Dikeh who said Joshua's prayers ended her 14-year smoking addiction.

Joshua earned a reputation for not focusing on the 'Prosperity Gospel' and Emmanuel TV is known as one of the few Christian channels that does not engage in fundraising on air.

YouTube channel
In April 2021, YouTube suspended Emmanuel TV's channel as a result of alleged hate speech by Joshua in videos on the channel. At the time the channel was suspended, it had over 1,800,000 subscribers and 400 million views. The allegations of hate speech referred to claims made by Joshua in at least seven videos that homosexuality is the result of possession by demonic spirits and that homosexuality can and should be cured via spiritual deliverance. At the time of the channel's suspension, it was the most-viewed Christian ministry on the platform.

Google ranked one of Emmanuel TV's YouTube videos as the fourth-most viewed clip ever within Nigeria.

Criticism and controversy
Joshua had many critics and was known to be controversial.

Joshua was publicly condemned by several prominent pastors within Nigeria, his most vocal critic being Pastor Chris Okotie who described him as a 'son of the devil'. The Christian Association of Nigeria and Pentecostal Fellowship Of Nigeria both acknowledged Joshua was not a member of either organisation and denounced him as an 'impostor'. Enoch Adeboye, David Oyedepo, Ayo Oritsejafor, Paul Adefarasin and Matthew Ashimolowo are among the pastors who publicly denounced Joshua, as did disgraced American megachurch leader Ted Haggard.

He was 'blacklisted' by the government of Cameroon in 2010 and termed a 'son of the devil'. Rumours of a visit by Joshua to Zimbabwe in 2012 led to an intense national debate, culminating with pastors and politicians strongly objecting.

In 2011, several media houses in UK reported at least three people in London with HIV died after they stopped taking life saving drugs on the advice of their pastors. The HIV prevention charity African Health Policy Network (AHPN) believed that SCOAN "may" be one of those involved in such practices although the three in question have no demonstrable link to SCOAN. The BBC quoted SCOAN as saying "No, we do not ask people to stop taking their medication".

On 14 September 2015, it was reported that Joshua "secretly purchased a $60 Million Gulfstream G550 Private Jet". These rumors were dismissed as false by a media aide of Joshua.

A self-confessed member of the Islamic terrorist group Boko Haram came to  SCOAN in March 2014, allegedly with plans to 'bomb' the church. According to him, it was Joshua's prayers that prevented the plan and later compelled him to confess. The subsequent clip of the confession went viral on YouTube and proved very controversial. A group known as the "Movement for Accountability and Good Governance", has called for the investigation of the incident based on the claims that were made.

Collapse of guesthouse

On 12 September 2014, a guesthouse collapsed in SCOAN's premises in Lagos killing at least 115 people, 84 of them South Africans. Controversy has continued to swirl around the circumstances that led to the collapse, with the former Nigerian Minister of Aviation Femi Fani-Kayode alleging Nigeria's intelligence agencies ‘blew up’ the building.

Panama Papers
Nigeria's Premium Times newspaper stated that Joshua incorporated a company called Chillon Consultancy Limited in the British Virgin Islands in June 2006, based on reports stemming from the Panama Papers leak. Joshua immediately denied his involvement, stating on Facebook, "I am not a businessman and have no business whatsoever. What God has given me is more than enough."

Threat by Muslim cleric
A prominent Nigerian Muslim cleric, Sheikh Hussaini Yusuf Mabera, threatened to drag Joshua to court for "describing Jesus Christ as God".

Personal life and death
Joshua was married to Evelyn Joshua and together they had three children, all girls. He died on 5 June 2021 after one of his evening services in Lagos, Nigeria, just one week prior to his 58th birthday. No cause of death was given.

Books 
 The Mirror 
 The Step Between You And The Cure 
 Daily Time With God 
 What The Future Holds

References

1963 births
2021 deaths
Yoruba Christian clergy
People from Ondo State
Prophets
Faith healers
Nigerian television evangelists
Nigerian Christian clergy
Religious tourism